Ravnenes Saga is the debut album from the Danish folk/Viking metal band Svartsot.

Track listing
"Gravøllet" – 4:36
"Tvende Ravne" – 4:14
"Nidvisen" – 4:34
"Jotunheimsfærden" – 4:03
"Bersærkergang" – 4:42
"Hedens Døtre" – 4:13
"Festen" – 3:14
"Spillemandens Dåse" – 3:40
"Skovens Kælling" – 3:03
"Skønne Møer" – 4:21
"Brages Bæger" – 3:05
"Havets Plage" – 4:35

Limited edition bonus tracks
"Drekar" – 4:12
"Hævnen" – 3:43

Credits
Claus B. Gnudtzmann - Vocals
Cristoffer J.S. Frederiksen - Lead guitar
Stewart Lewis - Flutes, bodhran
Michael L. Andersen - Rhythm guitar
Niels P. Thøgersen - Drums
Martin Kielland-Brandt - Bass

2007 debut albums
Svartsot albums
Napalm Records albums
Albums produced by Jacob Hansen